Vlaka is a village in the municipality of Ravno, Herzegovina-Neretva Canton, Federation of Bosnia and Herzegovina, Bosnia and Herzegovina. Prior the Bosnian war village belonged to municipality Trebinje, which is now in the Republika Srpska.

History 
Until the signing of the Dayton Peace Agreement, village was part of the then municipality of Trebinje, which became part of the Republika Srpska.

Demographics 
According to the 2013 census, its population was 9, all Serbs.

References

Populated places in Ravno, Bosnia and Herzegovina
Villages in the Federation of Bosnia and Herzegovina